The English National League was an ice hockey league in England that existed only for the 1981-82 season. It was the first national league contested in England since the old English National League was held in 1954. It was made up of teams from the Northern League, the English League North, and the English League South. Eight teams participated in the league, and the Streatham Redskins won the championship.

Regular season

References

Defunct ice hockey leagues in the United Kingdom
Defunct sports leagues in England
Ice hockey leagues in England
1981 establishments in England
1982 disestablishments in England
Sports leagues established in 1981
Sports leagues disestablished in 1982